Josina Walburgis van Löwenstein-Wertheim-Rochefort (1615-1683) was sovereign Princess Abbess of Thorn Abbey from 1631 until 1632. 

She was born to count Johann Dietrich von Löwenstein-Wertheim-Rochefort (1585-1644) and Josina de la Marck (1583-1626) and was placed in the abbey by her father. Thorn had been ruled by her two maternal aunts in succession (Anna von der Marck and Josina II von der Marck) and she was elected Princess abbess by the will of her father in 1631. The following year, she was the subject of a great scandal when she secretly married count Herman Frederik van den Bergh (1605-1669) and was deposed from her office: she was locked up by her father in another convent, but managed to escape and join her spouse in 1636.

References
Wil Tiemes, Löwenstein-Wertheim-Rochefort, Josina Walburgis van, in: Digitaal Vrouwenlexicon van Nederland. URL: http://resources.huygens.knaw.nl/vrouwenlexicon/lemmata/data/Lowenstein [13/01/2014]

1615 births
1683 deaths
Abbesses of Thorn